Alison Lee (born February 26, 1995) is an American professional golfer who plays on the LPGA Tour and is a college student at the University of California, Los Angeles. She was ranked number 1 in the World Amateur Golf Ranking for 16 weeks in 2013–14.

Amateur career
Lee was an AJGA First-Team All-American for six years, from 2008 through 2013, with nine wins on the AJGA circuit. She was a member of the victorious USA Junior Solheim Cup team in 2009, 2011, and 2013 helping to lead the US to three straight victories and was a member of the Junior Ryder Cup team in 2010 and 2012 and the Curtis Cup team in 2014.

Lee played one season and a half of golf at UCLA, before turning pro in December of her sophomore year. She remains a student at the University.

Professional career
Lee turned professional in December 2014 and joined the LPGA Tour after winning the final stage of the LPGA Qualifying Tournament.

In her rookie season, she qualified for the United States Solheim Cup team, based on her world ranking.

Amateur wins
2010 Winn Grips Heather Farr Classic, Mission Hills Desert Junior
2011 Los Angeles City Junior Girls
2012 Annika Invitational, Ping Invitational
2013 Rolex Junior Championship, Club Corp Mission Hills Desert Junior, Rolex Tournament of Champions, Betsy Rawls Longhorn Invite, Stanford Intercollegiate
2014 PAC-12 Championship, North and South Women's Amateur, Nanea PAC-12 Preview

Source:

Professional wins (1)

Ladies European Tour wins (1)

Results in LPGA majors
Results not in chronological order before 2019.

^ The Evian Championship was added as a major in 2013.

CUT = missed the half-way cut
NT = no tournament
T = tied

Summary

Most consecutive cuts made – 5 (three times, current)
Longest streak of top-10s – 1 (twice)

LPGA Tour career summary

 official as of 2022 season
* Includes matchplay and other tournaments without a cut.

World ranking
Position in Women's World Golf Rankings at the end of each calendar year.

U.S. national team appearances
Amateur
Junior Solheim Cup: 2009 (winners), 2011 (tie, Cup retained), 2013 (winners)
Junior Ryder Cup: 2010 (winners), 2012 (winners)
Curtis Cup: 2014 (winners)
Espirito Santo Trophy: 2014

Professional
Solheim Cup: 2015 (winners)

Solheim Cup record

References

External links

American female golfers
UCLA Bruins women's golfers
LPGA Tour golfers
Solheim Cup competitors for the United States
Golfers from Los Angeles
1995 births
Living people
21st-century American women
20th-century American women